Mathias Papendieck (born 18 February 1982) is a German politician of the Social Democratic Party (SPD) who has been serving as a member of the Bundestag in 2021.

Life and politics 
Papendieck was born 1982 in the East German town of Rüdersdorf and was elected directly to the Bundestag in September 2021. 

Within his parliamentary group, Papendieck belongs to the Parliamentary Left, a left-wing movement.

References 

Living people
1982 births
Social Democratic Party of Germany politicians
Members of the Bundestag 2021–2025
21st-century German politicians